Crave is the second album from the band Cyclefly, released on 8 April 2002. The album, originally called Tales from the Fish Bowl, had a vote by fans to decide the album art.

Track listing 
"No Stress" - 3:46
"Karma Killer" (with Chester Bennington) - 2:48
"Selophane Fixtures" - 3:13
"Crave" - 4:00
"Drive" - 3:48
"Crowns" - 4:17
"Lost Opinion" - 3:35
"King For A Day" - 4:12
"Fallen Wishes" - 3:26
"Bulletproof" - 3:07
"Tales From The Fishbowl" (with Sacha Puttnam) - 4:53
Bonus tracks
"Weary" - 4:05
"Accidental Ornaments" - 3:01

Outtakes
"Five Years" (David Bowie cover) - 6:03 (Blockbuster: A 70's Glitter Glam Rock Experience compilation)
"Small Idols" - 3:04 (No Stress single)
"Karma Killer (Bill Appleberry Mix)" - 2:47 (Released on the band's MySpace page)
"Crave (Sacha Puttnam & Ciaran O'Shea Remix)" - 4:00 (Released on the band's MySpace page)
"Middle Class" - 4:07 (Unreleased)
"Sufficate" (Unreleased)
"World Idiot" (Unreleased)
"Wormholes" - 3:49 (Unreleased)
"Angelgrace" (Unreleased)
"Slaves To The Sunshine" (Unreleased)
"Revolver" - 3:14 (Unreleased)
"Tranquillity" (Unreleased)
"A Perfect Feeling" (Unreleased)

Personnel

Cyclefly
Declan O'Shea - vocals, arrangement
Ciaran O'Shea - guitar, arrangement
NoNo Presta - guitar, arrangement
Christian Montagne - bass, arrangement
Jean-Michel Cavallo - drums, arrangement

Additional musicians
Chester Bennington - vocals (track 2)
Sacha Puttnam - strings, organ (track 11), arrangement (tracks 2, 7)

Technical personnel
Robert Flynt - photography
Sasha Jankovic - engineer
Alan Sanderson - engineer
Ian Blanch - engineer
Jeff Rothschild - engineer
Ciaran O'Shea - programming
David Bianco - mixing
Bill Appleberry - producer (tracks 1, 4, 5), engineer
Colin Richardson - producer
Tobias Miller - producer (tracks 1, 4, 5), engineer

Release history

References

External links
Cyclefly.com 

2002 albums
Cyclefly albums